Turtle racing is an event in which participants typically place turtles in the center of a circle and watch them walk around until one of them crosses out of the circle. Initially popularized as an event geared toward children at county fairs and picnics in the Central United States, it has since grown in scope and popularity and other variations of the event have been held.

Versions
Several variations of turtle racing exist. While turtle racing typically takes place on land, turtle races have occasionally occurred in pools as well. Some races begin with the turtles racing from a starting location and end when they reach a designated finish line. Outdoor races occasionally start the turtles in a sunny spot near a shaded area and the turtles by nature race into the shade. Other races begin with the turtles all being placed in the center of a large circle, the first to pass outside of the circle is deemed the winner. In some cases, a large lid is placed on top of the turtles before the race and the race begins when the lid is lifted off of them. The turtles are often distinguished by numbers painted or taped on their shells.

Some other events use floating artificial turtles in place of animals. The artificial turtles are floated from a starting point downstream or down a set of stairs to a finishing point.

In 1950, a patent was granted to Ambrose Groh of Cincinnati, Ohio for his turtle racetrack. Groh attempted to create a track that would allow a number of spectators to watch the race and would cause the turtles to start moving at the same time.

Venues

Turtle races often occur at fairs and local celebrations. For example, Turtle races are a prominent part of the annual Turtle Days festival held in Churubusco, Indiana, in honor of the Beast of Busco. In Lepanto, Arkansas the races are accompanied by beauty pageants that crown the "Turtle Derby Queen". They are also often used as fundraisers for organizations including aquariums, Catholic parishes, and student groups. Turtle racing also now commonly occurs at bars, where the races sometimes take place on shuffleboard tables.

Speed

Several estimates have been given for the average speed of a racing turtle. S.N. Castle, an early turtle racer, said that his turtles could travel  in four hours. At the 1974 Canadian Turtle Derby, the champion turtle raced from the center of a  circle to its edge in thirty nine seconds.

The size of a turtle is not necessarily an indicator of how fast the turtle will race. Some turtle racers have been surprised at the speed that smaller turtles exhibit.

History

Turtle racing initially became a popular pastime in The Bahamas in the early 20th century. The earliest known turtle race to occur in the United States took place in Chicago in 1902. Dubbed "The Strangest Race Ever Run" by the  Chicago Daily Tribune, seven turtles raced across a lawn while being ridden by small children. Although spectators attempted to lure them toward a finish line with cabbages, they were not able to coax the turtles to move in a straight line. A turtle race that took place in 1911 gained notoriety due to the participation of several celebrities, including playwright George Ade and former Massachusetts Governor Ebenezer Sumner Draper, who  organized a race between two large turtles while passengers on a Caribbean cruise. The next early turtle race to occur in the United States took place in Miami Beach in 1921. This event saw Loggerhead sea turtles racing in a pool. Another early American turtle race was started in the 1920s at the 101 Ranch in Kay County, Oklahoma and was held annually until it stopped in 1931 due to the Great Depression. In 1928, turtle racing was introduced to Hawaii by a man who brought thirty two "racing turtles" there from San Francisco.

Turtle racing has since become popular in Canada. Boissevain, Manitoba, located near Turtle Mountain, began hosting the Canadian Turtle Derby in 1972. The Canadian Turtle Derby was initially a private race among several local turtle owners. It soon grew in popularity and began to feature parimutuel betting. Molson donated an electric starting gate to the event, which they claimed was the first electric starting gate to be used in a turtle race. Although there were just 83 turtles in the 1972 event, the field swelled to 447 turtles by 1983. The race takes place in a  circle. Other festivals around Canada host races in which the top turtles qualify to represent their city in the Canadian Turtle Derby. Boissevain is now host to a turtle racing hall of fame and a large statue of a racing turtle. Initially crowning the Canadian Champion Turtle at the event, in 1974 they invited a top American turtle to the event to race the Canadian winner. The American team consisted of Lyle Parish, Howard Mitchell, and "Toby" the turtle. Several thousand people attended the final race in the competition. Although the race was initially close, the Canadian turtle was victorious after the American turtle fell asleep halfway through the race.

Boissevain held the Derby for 30 years, with great success. In its heyday, 16 turtles per heat, with 27 heats, vied for the Canadian title. If a turtle won its heat, it raced in one of three semi-final heats of 9 turtles each. The top three in each of these then raced for the Canadian Championship. In parallel, international heats were held to determine an international champ, usually from USA and often the team that raced at Zack's in Sausalito, CA. Then, the Canadian and International champs duked it out for the World Championship. World record time, for the 25 foot diameter carpet track was 16.8 seconds. Most successful stable was Klip N Beatty Stables, from Winnipeg and Calgary (Bruce Klippenstein and Doug/Danny Beatty). They won the Canadian championship 4 times and the World Championship 3 times (1977, 1978, 1990). Klip N Beatty Stables were invited to organize the Alberta Turtle Racing Championship at the 1981 Calgary Stampede. Their promotion included the World's First Flying Turtle Race (in partnership with Hot Air Balloon Association), a float in the Stampede Parade, and daily broadcast of the races on CHQR radio.

Turtle racing has also been popular among the British, as well. Members of the British army held turtle races on the foothills of Mount Olympus while stationed there after World War II. In the 1970s, a British organization known as the New World International Turtle Track Commission began hosting a world championship event. The 1974 event saw attendees from nine countries bring over two hundred turtles to the competition. The championship was rocked by a scandal, however, after it was discovered that one turtle had wheels from a toy car taped to its shell. The organizer of the event later lamented that this scandal occurred just as "Turtle racing stood on the verge of being a mass sport.

In 2007 Conservation International organized what they billed as the "Great Turtle Race". In order to raise awareness for the plight of the endangered leatherback turtle. They tagged several turtles in Costa Rica with satellite tracking tag before the turtles began their annual migration to the Galapagos Islands. The first turtle to arrive at the islands was deemed the winner. Celebrity sponsors, including Stephen Colbert, paid a $25,000 donation to conservation organizations for the right to sponsor a turtle. In 2009 National Geographic and Conservation International held the race again, tracking turtles migrating from Nova Scotia to the Caribbean.

The Minnesota Legislature has declared Longville, Minnesota the "Turtle Racing Capital of the World". They conferred this honor on Longville because it has held turtle races on its Main Street each summer since the nineteen fifties. The title has not gained international recognition, however.

Regulation
Many turtle races use wild turtles that are caught for use in the events, although this practice is illegal in some jurisdictions. Some turtle races use specialized netting to trap turtles. Although turtle trapping is illegal in Nebraska, several turtle races have been granted permission to trap turtles by the Nebraska Game and Parks Commission under the condition that the turtles be returned to the ponds in which they were caught after the races are complete.

Gambling
Turtle racing may also be illegal if bets are collected due to gambling regulations. In the United States, arrests have been made due to illegal gambling at turtle races almost as long as turtle racing has existed there. In 1930, members of the Boston Police Department raided a turtle race at which spectators paid a fee to sponsor a turtle and won a box of candy if their turtle was victorious. The police confiscated the turtles and candy and the organizer of the race was fined $60. The turtles were returned to him however, due to the lack of a proper police facility to store them.

At a turtle racing event in Ailsa Craig, Ontario in 1984, two organizers were arrested for "selling tickets on games of chance". Charges were dismissed on a technicality after a five-day trial. Organizers attempted to gain permission from the government of Ontario to allow gambling at the race, but were unsuccessful due to their use of parimutuel betting.

Danger
Although it is generally a safe event, turtles on occasion can pose a danger to spectators. On one occasion, a turtle bit a woman who had given it a kiss to celebrate its victory in a race. Paramedics responded and injected the turtle with Valium after the turtle refused to let go of the woman's lip. The injection did not seriously injure the turtle, who soon returned to racing.

Some turtle racers have attempted to cause turtles to move more quickly by stimulating specific areas of the brain with a low electric current. This poses a danger to spectators who may be accidentally electrocuted.

Controversy
Turtle racing has garnered controversy at times due to the treatment of turtles and the gambling that occurs at many races. The annual turtle races at the Gala Days in the Canadian village of Ailsa Craig have drawn particular scrutiny. After news of the annual turtle race was popularized in 2010, the Ontario Ministry of Natural Resources told the organizers to cancel the event. Ministry officials intervened due to wild turtles being caught in a nearby river in order to be used in the race, threatening to fine anyone who entered a wild animal in the race. A ministry spokesperson cited the danger of spreading disease and disrupting the ecosystem by catching wild turtles and then putting them back. The spokesperson also cited the stress that the race caused the turtles. The event later proceeded as planned after turtles were rented from a nearby pet store for use in the race. Many residents had been catching turtles for weeks in order to enter them in the race, and area residents had to release over one hundred turtles.

In 1987 the New Jersey Society for the Prevention of Cruelty to Animals issued court summonses regarding what they described as turtle abuse at turtle races at a restaurant in Plainfield, New Jersey. Although a judge ordered the races to be stopped, an investigation found that no abuse had occurred and the judge's order was rescinded.

Animal rights activists have described the sport as cruelty to turtles. The Market Days festival in Concord, New Hampshire cancelled its turtle racing event after it received complaints that the sport was a form of cruelty to animals. Archbishop Daniel Edward Pilarczyk has also opined against turtle racing, stating that the practice does not "mirror the compassion of Jesus".

PETA has endorsed rubber duck racing as a cruelty-free alternative to turtle racing.

See also

The Tortoise and the Hare
Achilles and the tortoise

References

Animal racing
Recurring events established in 1924
Games and sports introduced in 1924
Turtles
Annual events in Canada